This is a list of fictional nobility that have appeared in various works of fiction. This list is organized by noble rank and limited to well-referenced, notable examples of fictional members of nobility.

Dukes and duchesses

These are fictional characters with the title of "duke" or "duchess".

Marquesses and marchionesses

These are fictional characters with the title of "marquess" or "marchioness".

Counts and countesses

These are fictional characters with the title of "count" or "countess".

Earls

These are fictional characters with the title of "earl".

Viscounts and viscountesses

These are fictional characters with the title of "viscount" or "viscountess".

Barons and baronesses

These are fictional characters with the title of "baron" or "baroness".

Baronets and baronetesses

These are fictional characters with the title of "baronet" or "baronetess".

Lords and ladies

These are fictional characters with the title of "lord" or "lady".

Knights and dames

These are fictional characters with the title of "knight" or "dame".

Samurai

These are fictional characters with the title of "samurai", a Japanese title of warrior nobility similar to "knight".

Lairds

These are fictional characters with the title of "laird".

Esquires/squires

These are fictional characters with the title of "esquire" or "squire".

Other nobility

These are fictional noble characters that do not have the above titles.

See also
 List of fictional monarchs (fictional countries)
 List of fictional princes
 List of fictional princesses

References

External links
 Fictional aristocracy books on Barnes & Noble website

 
Fictional nobility
nobility